Ultra posse nemo obligatur is a Latin legal term, meaning, "No one is obliged beyond what he is able to do."

Ultra posse nemo obligatur has its origin in the Roman law. The expression can be found in Justinian's  Digesto. 

A common variant of the phrase ultra posse nemo obligatur is ad impossibilia nemo tenetur.

References

See also 
 The Constitution is not a suicide pact
 Impossibility

Brocards (law)
Latin legal terminology